Peggy Smith Martin (May 22, 1931 – August 24, 2012) was an American politician.

Peggy Annette Morris was born in Corinth, Mississippi. She moved with her family to Paducah, Kentucky, Detroit, Michigan, and finally to Chicago, Illinois. Martin went to Chicago Commercial College, University of Chicago, and to Kennedy–King College. She received her bachelor's degree in correctional and criminal justice from Governors State University. Martin was involved with the Democratic Party, She served in the Illinois House of Representatives from 1973 to 1975 and from 1977 to 1979.

Notes

1931 births
2012 deaths
Politicians from Chicago
People from Corinth, Mississippi
Governors State University alumni
University of Chicago alumni
Women state legislators in Illinois
Democratic Party members of the Illinois House of Representatives
21st-century American women